Udugama is a small town in Sri Lanka. It is located in Galle District of the Southern Province.

See also
List of towns in Southern Province, Sri Lanka

External links

Populated places in Southern Province, Sri Lanka